Obroshyne is a village in Lviv Raion, Lviv Oblast in western Ukraine. It hosts the administration of Obroshyne rural hromada, one of the hromadas of Ukraine. 
The population of the village is about 4186. Local government is administered by the village council.

Geography 
Obroshyne is located along Highway M06 (Ukraine), which goes from Kyiv to the Hungarian border near Chop.

History 
The first written mention of the village of Obroshyne dates to 1447. In 1456 King Casimir IV Jagiellon of Poland gave the estate to the Roman Catholic Archdiocese of Lviv.

Until 18 July 2020, Obroshyne belonged to Pustomyty Raion. The raion was abolished in July 2020 as part of the administrative reform of Ukraine, which reduced the number of raions of Lviv Oblast to seven. The area of Pustomyty Raion was merged into Lviv Raion.

Religious buildings 
 Church of St. Demetrius, 1914
 Roman Catholic Church, 1791 (in disrepair)

Attractions 
The village contains the following national heritage sites:
 Lviv Archbishops Residence,  1730 (number 477/0)
 Palace, 1730 ( number 477/1 )
 Bell tower of St. Demetrius, 1774 (number 491-M)
In addition,  is of national importance.

Notable residents 
 Lev Shankovsky (1903 - 1995). He and his wife were schoolteachers in the locality.

References

External links 

 Village of Obroshyne 
 Оброшинська ЗОШ ім.Л.Шанковського І-ІІІ ст., Лев Шанковський 
 Вісник Нац. ун-ту «Львівська політехніка» :  Професор Лев Полюга (квітка на могилу) / Олександра Сербенська,  Серія «Проблеми української термінології» – 2012.  – № 733. – С. 255–257.

Sources 
  Page 603

Villages in Lviv Raion